Rad Hourani (born 1982) is a Canadian fashion designer and artist known for his neutral, genderless creations.

Career
He created his unisex brand Rad Hourani in 2007 along with a unisex gender-neutral ready-to-wear collection.

Two years later, he presented his first photo and video exhibition at the Jardins du Palais-Royal in Paris and continues exhibiting his photographic work around the world, including a film projection at Centre Pompidou in Paris, a solo show in Montreal at the PHI Centre, an interactive installation at Tate Modern in London, as well as different installations at the FIT Museum in New York, MU Art Center in the Netherlands,  the Herning Museum of Contemporary Art in Denmark and the Cooper Hewitt Design Museum in New York. His most recent multidisciplinary exhibitions were presented at Arsenal Contemporary Art Center in Montreal, at the Museum of Fine Arts, Boston, a film installation at the Guggenheim Museum in Bilbao.

His work is included in the permanent collection of the Cooper Hewitt, Smithsonian Design Museum.

In January 2013, Hourani became an invited member of the Chambre Syndicale de la Haute Couture in Paris, making him both the first Canadian to show during Couture Week, as well as the first designer to show a unisex collection at this event.

References

Canadian fashion designers
Canadian photographers
1982 births
Artists from Paris
Living people